Sizihwan is a community and sightseeing spot in Gushan District, Kaohsiung, Taiwan, named for the adjacent bay of the Taiwan Strait, also called Sizihwan.

Names

The name Sizih can also refer to Xi Shi, an alternative name used by the poet Su Dongpo of the Song dynasty referring to the famous ancient beauty, which somehow implies the view in this scenic area is as beautiful as the lady.

Historical names include:
 
 , from Taiwanese Hokkien 
 , from

Geography
Located on the Taiwan Strait at the north of the entrance to Kaohsiung Harbor, Sizihwan is surrounded by mountains with Shoushan to the northeast and Shaochuantou Hill, a spur of Shoushan to the east.  The area is dominated by the campus of National Sun Yat-sen University  which faces the open waters of the Taiwan Strait. Sizihwan Beach (known as Takao Beach during Japanese rule) is a black sand beach that sits right at the edge of the campus and is a popular recreation area.  The Former British Consulate at Takao and the historic  at the peak of Shaochuantou overlook Sizihwan Bay.

Transportation
Sizihwan is directly accessible by bicycle and on foot through the Sizihwan Tunnel (through Shaochuantou mountain).  Built from 1927 to 1933, the tunnel is itself a tourist attraction.  Larger vehicular traffic can reach the area by two other more circuitous routes around the mountain.  Public bus service to the area is available from  #99 and O1(橘1) metro shuttle bus .  The nearest Kaohsiung Mass Rapid Transit station is the Orange Line's terminus at Sizihwan Station which, despite its name, is not in Sizihwan but in neighboring Hamasing.

Photo gallery

See also
 Shoushan (Kaohsiung)
 Former British Consulate at Takao
 National Sun Yat-sen University
 Port of Kaohsiung
 Sizihwan Station
 Kaohsiung

References

External links

Sizihwan Bay Beach
Kaohsiung City Government

Landforms of Kaohsiung
Bays of Taiwan
Gushan District